Judge Winter may refer to:

Ralph K. Winter Jr. (1935–2020), judge of the United States Court of Appeals for the Second Circuit
Harrison Lee Winter (1921–1990), judge of the United States Court of Appeals for the Fourth Circuit